Amarte es mi pecado (International title: My Love, My Sin) is a Mexican telenovela produced by Ernesto Alonso for Televisa in 2004.

The series stars Yadhira Carrillo, Sergio Sendel, Alessandra Rosaldo, Sylvia Pasquel, Alexis Ayala and René Casados.

In the United States, Univision broadcast Amarte es mi pecado weeknights at 9pm/8c from June 14, 2004 to October 22, 2004.

Plot 
In the city of Pátzcuaro lives Leonora "Nora" Guzmán y Madrigal de Horta (Yadhira Carrillo), a beautiful and naive woman, full of illusions. She is envied by women and desired by men, but she only has eyes for Alfredo de la Mora (Alejandro Ibarra), a poor young singer. Her father, Jacobo (Manuel Ojeda), continuously insists that she marries a rich and important man to get a life of luxury. On his deathbed, Nora promises to do so.

After the death of Jacobo, Nora suffers great dismay when her ambitious and evil stepmother, Isaura (Sylvia Pasquel), sells her to Heriberto Reyes (Antonio Medellín), the richest man in Pátzcuaro. Defending her honor, Nora wounds Heriberto; to avoid a scandal, he does not press charges against her. Pressured by the complaints of the neighbors and the rejection of all the people, Nora decides to commit suicide by jumping into a lake, but is rescued by Arturo Sandoval (Sergio Sendel), an attractive aviator pilot, who falls in love with her.

Soon after, Nora and Isaura go to live in Morelia with the only relative left to Nora, her aunt Alejandra Madrigal de Horta (Margarita Isabel), sister of her late mother. Alejandra is a wealthy high-society woman, greedy and hypocritical, who despises Isaura for considering her to be of a much lower class than her own and who only wants to marry Nora to a rich man to get rid of supporting her as soon as possible. Actually, Alejandra does not love Nora because she is the daughter of her sister Leonora and Jacobo, the man with whom she was always in love.

Alejandra keeps a great secret, many years ago she had a passionate night with Jacobo, which had terrible consequences: Alejandra gave birth to a girl whom she detests and humiliates, Casilda, whom she raised by posing as her goddaughter, to avoid the scandal. Casilda is an ugly and self-conscious girl, who envies Nora for her beauty and the attention that, falsely, Alejandra has for her. Isaura discovers the secret and feeds Casilda's hatred; She is even more upset when Leonardo Muñoz (Alexis Ayala), the handsome young man whom she has always secretly loved, falls deeply in love with Nora, although his love is never reciprocated.

In Morelia, Nora is reunited with Arturo and sleeps with him. Arturo loves her, but must leave when he is offered the job of his dreams: a commercial airline pilot. Arturo promises that he will return in a few months to marry her and Nora is happy, making preparations for their wedding while keeping it a secret from her aunt Alejandra. By chance, Arturo reunites with an old friend, Paulina (Alessandra Rosaldo). After a night of drinking, they discover they have slept together, but the two part due to ineludible obligations.

When Paulina returns to Mexico, she confesses what happened to her fiancé, Juan Carlos Orellana (René Casados), a rich and kind man who runs the magazine where she works as a reporter. Juan Carlos was always deeply envied by one of his closest employees, Sergio Samaniego (Odiseo Bichir), who go crazy through the story. Juan Carlos is comprehensive and insists they should go on with their wedding plans, but Paulina is full of doubts, because she realizes that she's in love with Arturo.

Nora discovers that she's expecting Arturo's child, but before she could tell him, Paulina informs Arturo that she is pregnant. The sense of responsibility forces Arturo to tell Nora what happened. Nora feels betrayed again, so she keeps her pregnancy a secret and decides to devote herself to her unborn child.

Meanwhile, Isaura blackmails Alejandra to tell her secret; then she convinces Casilda to kill Alejandra in order to take her money. Before dying, Alejandra tells the truth to Casilda. Shortly thereafter, Isaura, who only wants to live at the expense of Nora and Casilda, continues to feed the hatred and envy felt by Casilda for Nora. She succeeds when Casilda throws Nora out from her house and then murders Pilar Cansino (Emilia Carranza), a wealthy and kind designer who was willing to help Nora by giving her work as a model and seamstress. Finally, Isaura makes Nora believe that her daughter was stillborn and gives her daughter to Casilda whose baby really died. Thus, Isaura plunges Nora into despair in order to manipulate her at her will.

Completely shattered after the death of her daughter, Nora swears not love again and live with only one purpose in mind: to take advantage of her beauty to ruin men. Turned into a hard woman, Nora lives now only to make a fortune at the cost of whoever and to take revenge on all those who have hurt her; especially Arturo, who she wants to hate, but can not stop loving. She doesn't imagine that Isaura, who pretends to be her friend and still living at her side as her "sweet" stepmother, is really her worst enemy.

Ten years later, Nora becomes a famous and wealthy model, is married to Félix Palacios (Sergio Reynoso), a rich and mature man who adores her, but has mysterious business; however, Nora has not been able to stop thinking about Arturo. Paulina is also a recognized journalist, married to Arturo, who lives with her and Marisa, their daughter, but Paulina is deeply unhappy with Arturo who never loved her and is still deeply in love with Nora. Meanwhile, Arturo has different jobs that all end in failure, without suspecting that it was Nora who made him fired from his jobs.

The fate again brings together the paths of everyone so that they can clarify what happened, but Isaura try by all means that her intrigues are not discovered, she still wants to get more money from Nora and not want to lose her trust.

Arturo begins to work as a driver of Félix and Nora is constantly hiding from him. One day, Paulina hears Isaura saying she switched the girls of Casilda and Nora and she tries to convince Casilda to tell the truth. Leonora arrives and hears them talking.  Leonora confronts Isaura and leaves her locked in a room and plans to turn her to the police, but Isaura manages to escape.

Knowing that she's lost, Isaura shows a video to Félix in which Leonora and Arturo are seen kissing, and Felix is about to kill them. Paulina and Casilda make Isaura believe that Felix is about to arrive from his trip to kill Leonora and Arturo, and Paulina records Isaura with a camera confessing everything she has done. In order to take away the video, Isaura stabs Paulina with scissors. Paulina is dying, and asks Casilda to take the video to Félix. Félix arrives from his trip and as he is about to kill Leonora and Arturo, Casilda shows him the video and he lets them go.

On her deathbed, Paulina calls Leonora and Arturo and asks them to reconcile and be happy. Afterward, some men with whom Félix had made dirty businesses surround his house and murder him.

Isaura escapes and asks for help from Casilda, who makes her think she will help her run away. Following the advice of the spirit of her dead mother Alejandra, Casilda decides to ask a truck driver to take her, hides Isaura in the truck and convinces the truck driver to leave the forebay in a deserted place, leaving Isaura to die. Casilda then leaves with the truck driver to an unknown place.

A year later, Leonora and Arturo meet again in a church, and renew their love.

Cast

Main 

Yadhira Carrillo as Leonora "Nora" Guzmán y Madrigal de Horta de Sandoval
Sergio Sendel as Arturo Sandoval de Anda
Alessandra Rosaldo as Paulina Almazán Miranda
Sylvia Pasquel as Isaura Ávila vda de Guzmán
Alexis Ayala as Leonardo Muñoz de Santiago
René Casados as Juan Carlos Orellana

Also main 

Luis Gimeno as Clemente Sandoval
Adriana Roel as Gertrudis de Reyes
Antonio Medellín as Heriberto Reyes
Aarón Hernán as Joaquín Arcadio
Eugenio Cobo as Hipólito
Sergio Ramos as Silverio Almazán
Macaria as Dra. Clara Santacruz
Ninón Sevilla as Doña Galia de Caridad
Luis Bayardo as Manolo Tapia
Oscar Servin as Roque Ramos
Roberto Antúnez as Genaro Hernán
Emilia Carranza as Pilar Cansino
Alonso Echánove as  Felipe Fernández Del Ara
Xavier Marc as Evaristo López Monfor
Julio Monterde as Padre Javier Lucio
María Prado as Cholé Ocampo
Josefina Echánove as Damiana Mendiola
Antonio Miguel as Víctor Garduño
Tiaré Scanda as Casilda Guzmán y Madrigal de Horta
Odiseo Bichir as Sergio Samaniego
Alejandro Ibarra as Alfredo de La Mora/Alfredo Rangel Gómez
Alejandro Ruiz as Diego Fernández del Ara
Íngrid Martz as Renata Quiroga
Silvia Manríquez as Ana María Fernández del Ara
Dacia Arcaráz as Diana
Juan Carlos Casasola as Gonzalo Carrera
Jan as Roberto Peña
José Ángel Garcia as Julián Quiroga
Virginia Gimeno as Rebeca Duarte
Verónica Jaspeado as Mirta Fernández del Ara
Mauricio Aspe as Rafael Almazán Miranda
David Ramos as Pepe Luis Reséndez
Bibelot Mansur as Pascuala Ocampo
Jerardo as Agustín
Tatiana Rodríguez as Jessica Del Valle
Farah Abud as Cristina Palacios Moret
Verónica Toussaint as Jazmín
Óscar Ferretti as Baltazar Duarte
Conrado Osorio as Sandro

Special participation

Erika Buenfil as Gisela de López Monfort (VIllana. Termina en la ruina)
Margarita Isabel as Doña Alejandra Madrigal de Horta (Asesinada por Casilda e Isaura)
Manuel Ojeda as Jacobo Guzmán (Villano. Se suicida)
Juan Peláez as Carmelo Quintero (Villano.Termina solo)
Sergio Reynoso as Félix Palacios García
Gabriela Goldsmith as Kathy de Quiroga
Roberto Ballesteros as Marcelo Previni
Sergio Sánchez as Dr. Bermudez
Roberto Sen as Dr. Lozano
Ofelia Guilmáin as Doña Covadonga Linares de Almazán
Galilea Montijo as Galilea Montijo

Awards and nominations

References

External links 
 

2004 telenovelas
2004 Mexican television series debuts
2004 Mexican television series endings
Mexican telenovelas
Spanish-language telenovelas
Televisa telenovelas